London 3 Eastern Counties is an English rugby union league that is at the eighth level of the English rugby union system and is available to club sides based in Cambridgeshire, Norfolk and Suffolk (Eastern Counties).  Promoted teams move up to London 2 North East with league champions going up automatically and the runners up playing a playoff against the runners up from London 3 Essex, while demoted teams usually drop down to Eastern Counties 1, with new teams also coming up from this league, although only 1st XV sides are allowed in London 3 Eastern Counties.  Each year all clubs in the division also take part in the RFU Senior Vase - a level 8 national competition.

The division was created for the 2017-18 as part of an RFU reorganization of the London & South East regional league.  Originally there had been a London 3 North East league which had involved teams from the Eastern Counties as well as Essex and parts of north-east London.  Due to the distances involved for teams travelling potentially from London to Norfolk and vice versa, at the end of the 2016–17 season, this league was discontinued.  Teams in Cambridgeshire, Norfolk and Suffolk who had played in London 3 North East were transferred into the new look London 3 Eastern Counties 3 along with additional promoted teams from Eastern Counties 1, while the Essex and London sides went into another new division called London 3 Essex.

Participating Teams 2021-22

The teams competing in 2021-22 achieved their places in the league based on performances in 2019-20, the 'previous season' column in the table below refers to that season not 2020-21.

Ahead of the new season Crusaders, who finished 6th in 2019-20 withdrew from the league (and will instead participate in Eastern Counties Greene King Division Two North) meaning London 3 EC will run with 10 teams for this season.

Season 2020–21

On 30 October the RFU announced  that a decision had been taken to cancel Adult Competitive Leagues (National League 1 and below) for the 2020/21 season meaning London 3 Eastern Counties was not contested.

Participating Teams 2019-20

Participating Teams 2018-19

Participating Teams 2017-18

London 3 Eastern Counties honours

London 3 Eastern Counties is a tier 8 league with promotion up to London 2 North East and relegation down to Eastern Counties 1.

Promotion play-offs
Since the 2017–18 season there has been a play-off between the runners-up of London 3 Eastern Counties and London 3 Essex for the third and final promotion place to London 2 North East. The team with the superior league record has home advantage in the tie.  At the end of the 2019–20 season the London 3 Eastern Counties have been the most successful with two wins to the London 3 Essex teams none; and the home team has won promotion on two occasions compared to the away teams none.

Number of league titles

Stowmarket (1)
West Norfolk (1)
Wymondham (1)

See also
 London & SE Division RFU
 Eastern Counties RFU
 English rugby union system
 Rugby union in England

Notes

References

8
4
Rugby union in Cambridgeshire